Vaprio d'Adda (locally ) is a comune (municipality) in the Metropolitan City of Milan in the Italian region Lombardy, about  northeast of Milan.

Vaprio d'Adda borders the following municipalities: Trezzo sull'Adda, Capriate San Gervasio, Grezzago, Canonica d'Adda, Pozzo d'Adda, Cassano d'Adda, Fara Gera d'Adda.

Main sights
San Bernardino, ruins of Romanesque church
San Colombano; 12th-century Romanesque church
Villa Melzi, where Leonardo da Vinci resided for a while when studying channelling of waters in the Milanese area. It includes a fresco  of Madonna with Child attributed to him or his school.
''Villa Castelbarco: private 18th century villa and gardens

References

External links
 Official website

Cities and towns in Lombardy